Sanju Yadav (born 12 September 1997) is an Indian women's professional footballer who plays as a forward for Sethu in the Indian Women's League and represents the India women's national football team.

Early life
Born in the village of Alakhpura, Yadav began playing football at the age of ten in order to gain scholarships and money for her family. She mainly trained with her village and India national team.

Domestic career
In October 2016, Sanju was part of the Alakhpura side that took part in the preliminary round of the Indian Women's League. On 17 October 2016, she scored a hattrick for the club against Bodyline. This helped her side win 4–0. She was emerge as top scorer at league's preliminary round phase. Netting 11 times and thus help her team to qualify tournament's final round proper. At the final round of women's league proper she help her team to qualify in semi finale with scoring three times.

On 21 December 2016, after her performances for both club and country, Yadav was named as the AIFF Emerging Player of the Year.

She then joined  Rising Student's Club for 2017-18 Indian Women's League  and scored 2 goalsfor club in Final Round. In 2019 she joined  Gokulam Kerala FC.

International career
In February 2016, Yadav was selected as part of the 20-woman India squad that would participate in the 2016 South Asian Games. She made her debut and scored her first goal internationally on 13 February 2016 against Bangladesh. Her goal in the 74th minute was the fourth as India won 5–1 and moved into the gold medal match. Two days later she came on as a substitute in the 69th minute as India won the tournament, defeating Nepal 4–0 at the Jawaharlal Nehru Stadium in Shillong.

International goals

Goals Year

Honours

India
 SAFF Women's Championship: 2016, 2019
 South Asian Games Gold medal: 2016

Rising Students Club
 Indian Women's League: 2017–18

Individual
 AIFF Women's Emerging Player of the Year: 2016

References

External links 
 Sanju Yadav at All India Football Federation
 

Living people
Indian women's footballers
Sportswomen from Haryana
Footballers from Haryana
India women's international footballers
India women's youth international footballers
Women's association football forwards
South Asian Games gold medalists for India
1997 births
South Asian Games medalists in football
Gokulam Kerala FC Women players
Sethu FC players
Indian Women's League players